Qian Lingxi (26 July 1916 – 20 April 2009), also known as Tsien Ling-hi, was a Chinese civil engineer and physicist. An authority on engineering structural mechanics and computational mechanics, he served as president of the Dalian University of Technology (DUT) and was a founding member of the Chinese Academy of Sciences (CAS). DUT's Lingxi Library, opened in 2009, is named after him.

Early life and education 
On 26 July 1916, Qian was born in the town of Hongsheng (now Hongshan Subdistrict) outside the city of Wuxi in Jiangsu, China. His father, Qian Bogui, was the teacher of the celebrated historian Qian Mu (Ch'ien Mu), and his older brother Qian Linzhao (1906–1999) was also a distinguished physicist and a founding member of the CAS.

After obtaining his bachelor's degree in civil engineering from Institut Technique Franc-Chinois de Shanghai (now part of the University of Shanghai for Science and Technology) in 1936, he won a Boxer Indemnity Scholarship to study at the Université libre de Bruxelles in Belgium.

Career 

He returned to China in the fall of 1938, in the midst of the Second Sino-Japanese War. He participated in the design of the Yibin-Kunming and Sichuan-Yunnan railways, worked in the Bridge Design and Engineering Department of the Ministry of Communications, and taught at Yunnan University. In November 1943, he became professor of civil engineering at Zhejiang University, then exiled in Zunyi, Guizhou because Zhejiang was under Japanese occupation.

After the establishment of the People's Republic of China in 1949, Qian became Chair of the Department of Civil Engineering of Zhejiang University in 1950. In January 1952, after repeated invitations from Qu Bochuan, President of Dalian Institute of Technology (now Dalian University of Technology or DUT), Qian agreed to move to Dalian to teach at DUT. He spent the rest of his career there, and succeeded Qu as the second president of the university. In 1955, he became one of the founding members of the Chinese Academy of Sciences.

During the Cultural Revolution, top experts including Qian Lingxi and Huang Xuhua were denounced as "reactionary academic authorities" and dismissed from their posts. When China's nuclear submarine project needed Qian's help to analyze its structural designs, its leader Chen Youming had to appeal directly to Premier Zhou Enlai to make him available to the strategic program.

Contributions

Research 
Qian devoted himself to research in engineering structural mechanics. He made important contributions in variation principles to limit analysis, computational mechanics and structural optimization.

In 1950, Qian published his influential paper "Theory of Complementary Energy" in the journal Science in China. It led his student Hu Haichang to derive the Hu–Washizu principle in 1954.

In the early 1960s, Qian and his student Zhong Wanxie published two papers in Science in China and Acta Mechanica Sinica, on the "general variational theory of limit analysis and plasticity". Their research was used in submarine design and was awarded national prizes.

In the 1970s, Qian designed the main part of China's first modern petroleum port in Dalian, Liaoning. In the early 1980s, Qian, together with Zhong Wanxie and Cheng Gengdong, developed DDDU, an advanced computer system for structural design. DDDU was used in many major engineering projects.

Education 
In 1951, Qian wrote two structural mechanics textbooks, which were widely used in Chinese universities and educated a generation of Chinese civil engineers.

Qian is celebrated in China as a "Bo Le" for scientists. Six of his former students have become academicians: Pan Jiazheng, Hu Haichang, Cheng Gengdong, Zhong Wanxie, Qiu Dahong, and Yang Jinzong. Pan Jiazheng, who was Qian's student at Zhejiang University, almost dropped out of college because of poverty. When Qian learned about his situation, he paid for Pan's tuition and living expenses out of his own pocket until his graduation. Pan would later become one of the chief engineers of the Three Gorges Dam.

Major publications 
[1] Qian Lingxi, China Science Book and Instrument Company, Shanghai, 1951.

[2] Qian Lingxi, China Science Book Instrument Company, Shanghai, 1952.

[3] Б. Н. Жемочкин, Translated by Qian Lingxi. Transportation Ministry of Inland Waterway Technology Research Group, 1953.

[4] Э. Ф. Gorhuangwei, Т. В. Ender. , Translated by Qian Lingxi and Gao Guofan. People's Communications Press, Beijing, 1955.

[5] (Based on the lecture notes prepared by Qian Lingxi) Compiled by the General Administration of Navigation Engineering, Ministry of Communications of the People's Republic of China, Port
Building, Vol 1, People's Communications Publishing House, Beijing, 1955.

[6] Н. Х. Arugiu Nieyang, Translated by Wu Ruifeng, Lu Kuangzhou, Fang Xiaoshu, Zhao Deyong, Qian Lingxi, etc., Beijing Science Press, Beijing, 1961.

[7] Qian Lingxi and Zhong Wanxie, The Science and Technology Commission of the Republic of China, Beijing, 1964.

[8] Qian Lingxi, editor in chief, Guanghua Publishing House, Beijing, 1979.

[9] Qian Lingxi,  (including drawings and errata), Printed by Dalian Institute of Technology, Dalian, 1981.

[10] Qian Lingxi, editor in chief, Peking University Press, Beijing, 1981.

[11] W. J. Krefeld and W. G. Bowman, Translated by Qian Lingxi, Science Press, Beijing, 1982.

[12] Qian Lingxi, China Academic Press, Beijing, 1982.

[13] Prepared by the Steel Bridge Design Group of the Engineering Mechanics Department of Dalian Institute of Technology, reviewed and updated by Qian Lingxi, People's Communications Press, Beijing, 1982.

[14] Qian Lingxi, Water Conservancy and Electric Power Press, Beijing, 1983.

[15] Qian Lingxi, Science Press, Beijing, 2011.

[16] Qian Lingxi, Science Press, Beijing, 2011.

Death and legacy 
Qian died on 20 April 2009 in Dalian, at the age of 92. Top Chinese Communist Party (CCP) leaders, including CCP General Secretary Hu Jintao, former CCP General Secretary Jiang Zemin, Premier Wen Jiabao, and former Premier Li Peng, paid their respects at his funeral.

In the same year, DUT inaugurated its new library and named it Lingxi Library in his memory; it is one of the largest university libraries in Northeast China.

References 

1916 births
2009 deaths
Boxer Indemnity Scholarship recipients
Chinese civil engineers
Chinese expatriates in Belgium
Academic staff of Dalian University of Technology
Educators from Wuxi
Engineers from Jiangsu
Free University of Brussels (1834–1969) alumni
Members of the Chinese Academy of Sciences
Physicists from Jiangsu
Scientists from Wuxi
University of Shanghai for Science and Technology alumni
Academic staff of Yunnan University
Academic staff of Zhejiang University